The Church of Jesus Christ of Latter-day Saints in Botswana refers to the Church of Jesus Christ of Latter-day Saints and its members in Botswana. The first branch (small congregation) was organized in 1991 with fewer than 100 members. As of 2021, there were 3,826 members in 16 congregations in Botswana.

History

The first branch of the LDS Church in Botswana was organized in 1983. LDS missionaries were not sent to Botswana until 1990 and the church did not receive official recognition until 1991. Among the early converts in Botswana was Kwasi Agyare Dwomoh, a Ghanaian architect employed by the government of Botswana. Dwomoh and his family joined the church in September 1990. He became the first branch president in August 1991, and the first district president in March 1992. He and his wife were the first couple to travel from Botswana to be sealed in the temple.

In 1995, all LDS Church units were included in the newly formed Roodeport South Africa Stake. The first Motswana to serve a full-time mission for the LDS Church, Yakale Million Moroka, began serving as a missionary in 1999 in the South Africa Cape Town Mission.

In the early 2000s, the church formed its first branch in Francistown in the north of Botswana. In 2009, missionaries were regularly sent there for the first time. In 2010, branches were formed in two additional cities. In 2012, a new stake was organized in Gaborone with Clement Mosiame Matswagothata as its president, and in 2013 Botswana was given its own mission.

Stake and Congregations

The Gaborone Botswana Stake was created on November 4, 2012.
As of February 2023, Botswana had the following congregations:

Gaborone Botswana Stake
Gaborone Broadhurst Ward
Gaborone West Ward
Gaborone West YSA Ward
Kanye 1st Branch
Kanye 2nd Ward
Lobatse Ward
Mochudi Ward
Mogoditshane Ward
Molepolole Ward
Village Ward

Other Congregations
The following congregations are located in Botswana but are not part of a stake or district:
Botswana/Namibia Mission Branch
Francistown Branch
Gerald Branch
Kasane Branch
Monarch Branch
Serowe Branch

The Botswana/Namibia Mission Branch serves families and individuals in Botswana and Namibia that is not in proximity of a meetinghouse.  Congregations not part of a stake are called branches, regardless of size.

Missions
The Botswana Namibia Mission was created July 2013. In November 2022, the LDS Church announced it will be crating the South Africa Pretoria Mission in July 2023. The mission will consist of the South Africa portion of the Botswana-Namibia Mission as well as a portion of the South Africa Durban Mission. On July 2023, the Botswana Namibia mission will be realigned to only cover Botswana and Namibia.

Namibia

The LDS Church reported 998 members in 4 congregations as well as 1 family history centers in Namibia for year-end 2021. The Windhoek Namibia District was created on 8 March 2015. A family history center is located in Windhoek.

Congregations
As of February 2023, the following were located in Namibia:
Windhoek Namibia District
Katutura Branch
Swakopmund Branch
Wanaheda Branch
Windhoek Branch

Other Congregations
The following congregations are located in Botswana but are not part of a stake or district:
 Botswana/Namibia Mission Branch
 Ongwediva Branch

The Botswana/Namibia Mission Branch serves families and individuals in Botswana and Namibia that is not in proximity of a meetinghouse.  Congregations not part of a stake are called branches, regardless of size.

Temples
As of July 2023, Botswana and Namibia were located in the Johannesburg South Africa Temple District.

See also

 Religion in Botswana

References

External links
 LDS Newsroom (Botswana)
 The Church of Jesus Christ of Latter-day Saints - Official Site
 ComeUntoChrist.org - Visitors Site

Churches in Botswana
The Church of Jesus Christ of Latter-day Saints in Africa